The Garden (Ha-Gan) is a 1977 Israeli drama film directed by Victor Nord, his first feature. It stars Shaike Ophir, a young Melanie Griffith, Zachi Noy, Sa'adia Damari, and Shoshana Duer. The film is about a wandering young woman (Griffith) and her encounters with attackers, and an old man who faces eviction from his garden.

Reception
Variety wrote: 
"The Garden" is a beautiful film, a poem of sound and visual effects ...
Shai K. Ofir is moving in his portrayal of the pious old man, stubborn yet naive and sensitive. The dumb girl is played gracefully by American actress, Melanie Griffith".
(Victor Nord, the director) "proves to have a marvelous sense of beauty and works well with actors. ...The music by Noam Sharif gives an extra dimension." ("Variety", Wednesday, June 1, 1977/ Film reviews, page 16)

References

External links
 
 

Israeli drama films
1977 films
1977 drama films
1970s Hebrew-language films
Films directed by Victor Nord